Six Weeks is a 1982 American drama film directed by Tony Bill and based on the 1976 novel of the same name by Fred Mustard Stewart. It stars Dudley Moore, Mary Tyler Moore, and Katherine Healy.

Plot

Charlotte Dreyfus, a wealthy cosmetic tycoon, and her 12-year-old daughter Nicole (Nicky), who's dying from leukemia, strike up a sentimental friendship with a California politician, Patrick Dalton. Nicole has decided to abandon all further treatments for the disease because of the treatments' side effects. Charlotte is determined to help her daughter achieve various 'bucket list" goals including Nicole's desires to work for Dalton's dark-horse campaign. Dalton, who is initially taken aback by Charlotte's generous campaign donation, allows Nicky to help at the campaign office after she alludes to Nicky having a terminal illness. Dalton, the mother, and daughter slowly grow closer over the short period of time and while watching Nicky practicing her ballet, Dalton confronts Nicky about her illness. Initially angry, Nicky admits to having leukemia after Dalton admits that he has secrets as well-including an extramarital affair in the past.

Much to the consternation of Dalton's wife, he develops more attachment to Charlotte and Nicole. She confronts him about having to share him with a second family. Meanwhile Nicky has grown attached to Dalton as a father figure and has secret ambitions of Dalton and her mother developing more than a friendship. Swept up in Nicky's charm and terminal wishes, Dalton and Charlotte do admit to their mutual feelings for each other over dinner but agree to not take it any further so as to protect his wife and son.

Charlotte decides to take Nicky to New York City as a break from Los Angeles but it's an excuse to create some distance from the ill-fated relationship. Impulsively, Dalton races to the airport and joins them on their vacation-leaving his family behind for the Christmas Holidays. During their time in New York, various events and places are crossed off Nicky's list of lifelong desires. As she reads her list to Dalton, she admits she regrets not having danced in a major ballet troupe-partially because she dedicated too much time to his campaign. Guilty, the next day Dalton uses his political charm, gets Nicky a "try out" at the New York Metropolitan Ballet.  The Ballet director, skeptical at first, admits that Nicky has professional potential and agrees to quickly train her for a full-dress rehearsal, stand-in part of the Nutcracker.

Treating it as opening night, Dalton and Charlotte go to Lincoln Center

Before the main dance scene of Clara and the Prince, Nicky slips into position and takes over as understudy. She has a triumphant performance in front of the rehearsal crowd and is again able to cross off another item from her wish list. On the way back to the hotel, Nicky says she has never been on the NYC Subway. Enjoying the ride, Nicky suddenly is overcome with pain and collapses of an acute stroke(complications of Leukemia). Dalton and Charlotte accompany her to the hospital but she passes away en route.

The final scene is Dalton taking Charlotte to the airport, where she plans to mourn in a family vacation spot in France. She walks away, hesitates, and then continues. The epilogue has Dalton writing to Charlotte saying that his campaign was successful and don't forget to "write your Congressman."

Cast
 Dudley Moore as Patrick Dalton
 Mary Tyler Moore as Charlotte Dreyfus
 Katherine Healy as Nicole Dreyfus
 Shannon Wilcox as Peg Dalton
 Bill Calvert as Jeff Dalton
 Joe Regalbuto as Bob Crowther
 John Harkins as Arnold Stillman

Production
Golden Globe-nominated actress and ballet dancer Anne Ditchburn choreographed Healy's dance scenes, as well as appearing on camera as an assistant choreographer.

Release
Six Weeks was released on December 17, 1982, in the United States, where it opened in tenth place and grossed $6.7 million.

Reception

The film was nominated for two Golden Globe Awards, one for Dudley Moore for Best Score and one for Katherine Healy as Best New Female Star of the Year. However, Mary Tyler Moore's performance earned a Razzie Award nomination for Worst Actress. Roger Ebert later named it one of the worst films of 1982. Gene Siskel however, liked the film, praising the performances from the leads and its go-for-broke sentiment.  Ebert later related a story in which Siskel admitted that his review was influenced by his wife's pregnancy.

References

Further reading

External links

1982 films
1980s Christmas drama films
American drama films
American Christmas films
Films set in New York City
Films shot in New York City
PolyGram Filmed Entertainment films
Universal Pictures films
Films produced by Jon Peters
Films produced by Peter Guber
1982 drama films
Films directed by Tony Bill
1980s English-language films
1980s American films
Films about disability